Frank Findley Mackay (July 20, 1832 – May 6, 1923) was an American actor and author. He was vice president and the chairman of the executive committee of the Actors Fund of America. He was the founder of the National Congress of Dramatic Art.

Biography
Mackay was born on July 20, 1832 in Upper Canada (now Ontario, Canada) to Francie Mackay and Elizabeth Findley of Scotland. His parents had migrated from Scotland to New York City but fled the city for Canada during the cholera epidemic of 1832. He started in theater in 1848 at the Arch Street repertory theatre in Philadelphia, Pennsylvania.

In 1863, he married Elizabeth J. Sneathan and they had three children, Charles Donald, Edward, and William Andrew Mackay.

In 1913, he wrote The Art of Acting. In 1916 he was commemorated as the oldest living Broadway actor.

He died on May 6, 1923, in Fort Lee, New Jersey at the home of his son, Charles.

References

External links

1832 births
1923 deaths
Actors Fund of America
Pre-Confederation Canadian emigrants to the United States
American stage actors